The 2010–11 Longwood Lancers men's basketball team represented Longwood University during the 2010–11 NCAA Division I men's basketball season. The team was led by eighth-year head coach Mike Gillian, and played their home games at Willett Hall as a Division I independent school.

Last season
The Lancers had a record of 12–19.

Roster

Schedule 

|-
!colspan=9 style="background:#002B7F; color:#AFAAA3;"| Regular season

References

2010-11 team
2010–11 NCAA Division I men's basketball independents season
2010 in sports in Virginia
2011 in sports in Virginia